The 2000 Detroit Tigers season was the team's 100th season and its first season at Comerica Park, after playing at Tiger Stadium since 1912, at the corner of Michigan Avenue and Trumbull Avenue (also site of their previous stadiums since 1896).

Offseason
 November 2, 1999: Juan González was traded by the Texas Rangers with Danny Patterson and Gregg Zaun to the Detroit Tigers for Frank Catalanotto, Francisco Cordero, Bill Haselman, Gabe Kapler, Justin Thompson, and Alan Webb (minors).
 November 15, 1999: Luis Polonia was signed as a free agent with the Detroit Tigers.
November 29, 1999: Mike Oquist was signed as a free agent with the Detroit Tigers.
March 7, 2000: Gregg Zaun was sent to the Kansas City Royals by the Detroit Tigers as part of a conditional deal.
March 13, 2000: Mike Oquist was released by the Detroit Tigers.
March 26, 2000: Mike Oquist was signed as a free agent with the Detroit Tigers.

Regular season
On October 1, 2000, Dusty Allen hit a home run in the last at-bat of his career.

Comerica Park
Groundbreaking for a new ballpark to replace Tiger Stadium for the Detroit Tigers was held on October 29, 1997, and the new stadium was opened to the public in 2000.  At the time of construction, the scoreboard in left field was the largest in Major League Baseball.  In December 1998, Comerica Bank agreed to pay US$66 million over 30 years for the naming rights for the new ballpark.  Upon its opening, there was some effort to try to find a nickname for the park, with the abbreviation CoPa suggested by many, but that nickname has not gained widespread acceptance.

First Game

The first game at Comerica Park was held on Tuesday, April 11, 2000, with 39,168 spectators attending, on a cold snowy afternoon. Grounds people had to clear snow off the field from the night before.  The Tigers defeated the Seattle Mariners by a score of 5-2. The winning pitcher, like in the final game at Tiger Stadium was Brian Moehler.

Season standings

Record vs. opponents

Notable transactions
May 10, 2000: Rich Becker was signed as a free agent with the Detroit Tigers.
July 31, 2000: Luis Polonia was released by the Detroit Tigers.

Roster

Player stats

Batting
Note: G = Games played; AB = At bats; H = Hits; Avg. = Batting average; HR = Home runs; RBI = Runs batted in

Note: pitchers' batting statistics not included

Pitching

Starting pitchers
Note: G = Games pitched; IP = Innings pitched; W = Wins; L = Losses; ERA = Earned run average; SO = Strikeouts

Other pitchers
Note: G = Games pitched; IP = Innings pitched; W = Wins; L = Losses; ERA = Earned run average; SO = Strikeouts

Relief pitchers 
Note: G = Games pitched; IP = Innings pitched; W = Wins; L = Losses; SV = Saves; ERA = Earned run average; SO = Strikeouts

Farm system

References

External links

2000 Detroit Tigers season at Baseball Reference
Tigers on Baseball Almanac

Detroit Tigers seasons
Detroit Tigers
Detroit
2000 in Detroit